Michael Christian von Tetzschner (born 9 February 1954 in Copenhagen, Denmark), commonly known as Michael Tetzschner, is a Norwegian politician for the Conservative Party. He is the President of the Nordic Council during 2018.

Tetzschner was Governing Mayor of Oslo from 1989 to 1992. He was elected to the Norwegian Parliament from Oslo in 2009.

He grew up in Copenhagen in Denmark until he was eight years old, when he moved to his grandparents in Oslo. He lives with politician Kristin Clemet.

References

External links

1954 births
Living people
Members of the Storting
Politicians from Oslo
Conservative Party (Norway) politicians
21st-century Norwegian politicians
Norwegian people of German descent